Bradley Kenneth Rigby (born May 14, 1973) is an American former professional baseball pitcher.

College career
Rigby attended Georgia Tech, and in 1992 he played collegiate summer baseball with the Orleans Cardinals of the Cape Cod Baseball League. He was part of the 1994 Georgia Tech Yellow Jackets baseball team that was the runner-up in the 1994 College World Series. Rigby was named to the All-Tournament team.

Professional career
Rigby was drafted by the Oakland Athletics in the 1994 Amateur Draft. He made his first MLB appearance in 1997.

References

External links

1973 births
Living people
American expatriate baseball players in Canada
Baseball players from Milwaukee
Edmonton Trappers players
Georgia Tech Yellow Jackets baseball players
Huntsville Stars players
Kansas City Royals players
Major League Baseball pitchers
Modesto A's players
Montreal Expos players
Oakland Athletics players
Orleans Firebirds players
Ottawa Lynx players
Somerset Patriots players
Vancouver Canadians players
Lake Brantley High School alumni